Noëlle Roorda is a Dutch Paralympic athlete who competes in the javelin throw at international elite competitions. She is a European champion and has been selected to compete at the 2020 Summer Paralympics. She won the silver medal with a personal best of 40.06m.

Roorda was inspired to take part in athletics by admiring her idol Thomas Röhler.

References

2000 births
Living people
Sportspeople from Amstelveen
Paralympic athletes of the Netherlands
Dutch female javelin throwers
Medalists at the World Para Athletics European Championships
Athletes (track and field) at the 2020 Summer Paralympics
Medalists at the 2020 Summer Paralympics
Paralympic silver medalists for the Netherlands
Paralympic medalists in athletics (track and field)